The Pan Africanist Student Movement of Azania (PASMA) is a revolutionary student movement born at the University of the Western Cape, Cape Town, South Africa. It was founded in 1989 as the "Pan Africanist Student Organisation of Azania" (PASO) in Roodepoort, Johannesburg. Among its founders were Lungelo Mbandazayo (Founding President) and Lawrence "General" Nqandela (Secretary General), who led the Pan Africanist Congress of Azania youth wing.

References

See also
Pan Africanist Youth Congress of Azania
Pan-Africanism
African socialism

Civic and political organisations based in Johannesburg
Pan-Africanism in South Africa
Pan Africanist Congress of Azania
Pan-Africanist organizations in Africa
University of the Western Cape
Student organisations in South Africa